is the president of the Japan Aerospace Exploration Agency (JAXA).

Keiji Tachikawa was born in Gifu Prefecture on May 27, 1939. He graduated from University of Tokyo, Department of Electrical Engineering
School of Engineering, in 1962. In 1978, he earned an MBA from the MIT Sloan School of Management. In 1982, he earned a Ph.D Engineering degree in University of Tokyo.

Tachikawa joined Nippon Telegraph & Telephone (NTT) in 1962 as a young engineering graduate. He later joined NTT's subsidiary, NTT DoCoMo, and served as its president from 1998 to 2004.

In 2004, Tachikawa became president of JAXA, to restructure the agency after a 2003 H-IIA rocket launch failure.

References

External links
http://www.nikkei.co.jp/summit/99summit/speaker/tacikawa.html
http://www10.org/keynoters/tachikawa.html

MIT Sloan School of Management alumni
Japanese chief executives
MIT Sloan Fellows
1939 births
Living people
Nippon Telegraph and Telephone
People from Gifu Prefecture
University of Tokyo alumni